Michael Schlessinger is a Professor Emeritus of Mathematics at the University of North Carolina at Chapel Hill who worked in algebraic geometry.

Career
Schlessinger obtained his Ph.D. in 1964 from Harvard University, under the supervision of John Tate.

He proved Schlessinger's theorem about representable functors of Artinian algebras and introduced Lichtenbaum–Schlessinger functors in deformation theory.

In 2012 he became a fellow of the American Mathematical Society.

References

External links
Michael Schlessinger UNC page

20th-century American mathematicians
21st-century American mathematicians
Harvard University alumni
University of North Carolina at Chapel Hill faculty
Fellows of the American Mathematical Society
Living people
Year of birth missing (living people)